Guram "Guliko" Sagaradze (Georgian გურამ საღარაძე ; born 21 March 1939) is a retired Georgian welterweight freestyle wrestler. He held the world title in 1963 and 1965 and won silver medals at the 1964 Olympics and 1966 and 1967 world championships. Domestically, he won the Soviet title in 1964–66, placing second in 1967; he finished third in 1968 and was not selected for the 1968 Olympics. He retired the same year to become a wrestling coach in his native Georgia.

References

Soviet male sport wrestlers
Olympic wrestlers of the Soviet Union
Wrestlers at the 1964 Summer Olympics
Male sport wrestlers from Georgia (country)
Olympic silver medalists for the Soviet Union
Olympic medalists in wrestling
1939 births
Living people
Sportspeople from Tbilisi 
Burevestnik (sports society) athletes
Medalists at the 1964 Summer Olympics
World Wrestling Championships medalists
European Wrestling Championships medalists